Impatiens omeiana is a species of flowering plant in the family Balsaminaceae. It is endemic to China, where it occurs in Sichuan.

The wild plant is rhizomatous, growing up to half a meter tall, with large, yellow flowers.

It is grown in cultivation as an ornamental plant. One common name is hardy impatiens. Cultivars include 'Eco Hardy' and 'Ice Storm'.

Sources

Endemic flora of China
omeiana
Endangered plants
Taxonomy articles created by Polbot